The Rassemblement pour l'alternative progressiste or RAP began as the Rassemblement pour l'alternative politique, a social movement founded in 1997 as an attempt to unite the progressive and leftist forces in Quebec, Canada. It presented seven independent candidates (including former trade union leader Michel Chartrand) in the 1998 Quebec provincial election, and became a political party in 2000.

In 2002, it joined with the Parti de la démocratie socialiste and the Parti communiste du Québec to form the Union des forces progressistes (UFP). In 2006, the UFP joined with the Option citoyenne social movement to form the Québec solidaire party.

See also

 Politics of Quebec
 List of Quebec general elections
 List of Quebec premiers
 List of Quebec leaders of the Opposition
 National Assembly of Quebec
 Timeline of Quebec history
 Political parties in Quebec

References

External links
 National Assembly historical information
 La Politique québécoise sur le Web

Provincial political parties in Quebec
Political parties established in 1996